Momina krepost (Maiden’s Fortress) also called Devingrad() is a medieval stronghold located on a hill with the same name in Veliko Tarnovo in northern Bulgaria. This hill was one from the three main hills when Medieval Tarnovgrad was the capital of the Second Bulgarian Empire (1185-1396 AD).

History
The hill at Momina Krepost was one of four hills of medieval Veliko Tarnovo, known as a stronghold since Byzantine times. Legends say that the side of the hill to the river Ether (Yantra) was heavily polluted by craftsmen in an area where cattlemen and farmers also lived.

Complex 
The stronghold was surrounded by a fortress wall and had two gates. Inside the hill there was few churches, necropolis, craft shops and housing.

Archeology 
The Czech-Bulgarian archaeologist Karel Skorpil and his brother Hermann Skorpil explored the hill in the end t of the 19th century. On the hill were found citadel o about 300 meters long and 30-40 meters wide by Assist. Prof. Evgeni Dermendzhiev from the Veliko Tarnovo Regional Museum of History.

References

External links
The Third Rome - film for Veliko Tarnovo - YouTube

A.Smirnov - Tarnovgrad Literary Collection for the Old Bulgarian Capital Otechestven front 1985,Sofia

Buildings and structures in Veliko Tarnovo
History of Veliko Tarnovo
Palaces in Bulgaria
Castles in Bulgaria